Neptosternus starmuehlneri, is a species of predaceous diving beetle found in Sri Lanka.

Description
This oval moderately convex, larger species has a typical length of about 3.5 to 3.7 mm. Dorsal surface shiny. Head and pronotum testaceous. Anterior and posterior margin of the pronotum broadly dark brown. Pronotum yellowish with anterior and posterior margins dark brown. Pronotum yellowish with some darkened areas along anterior and posterior margins. There is no any lateral yellow margin which is found in other similar species. Elytron with a separate median presuturai yellow spot. This spot rarely connects with subbasal or apical spots. Pronotum transverse, and slightly convex. Elytra little convex, and punctation very fine. Elytra dark brown with four testaceous spots. There is a long transverse spot located behind the elytral base. With that spot, there is an irregular anterior margin, two median spots, and a triangular one at the margin. A big triangular apical spot is present. Head, anteriorly widely rounded, with fine microreticulation and sparse, fine punctuation. Ventrum microreticulated finely, testaceous, with darker epipleura. Legs testaceous.

References 

Dytiscidae
Insects of Sri Lanka
Insects described in 1973